Bachórz may refer to:

Bachórz, Podkarpackie Voivodeship, a village in Podkarpackie Voivodeship, Poland
Bachórz River (:pl:Bachórz (potok)), a tributary of the Vistula
Józef Bachórz, Polish philologist
Simón Bajour, violinist, born Szymon Bachórz